Hugo Mariano Pavone (born 27 May 1982) is an Argentine former professional footballer who last played for Quilmes Atlético Club as a striker.

Club career

Estudiantes
Born in Tres Sargentos, Buenos Aires Province, Pavone left his childhood club Boca Juniors at the age of 14, and went on to feature for Estudiantes de La Plata in the Argentine Primera División during seven years (11 comprising youth). His first notable achievement there was scoring 16 goals in the 2005 edition of the Clausura, being crowned the competition's top scorer; furthermore, he was the joint top scorer of the 2006 Copa Libertadores with five goals.

Pavone was selected by sports newspaper Olé as the best player in the 2006 Apertura tournament, where he helped Estudiantes win the championship playing 17 games and scoring 11 goals. These included his team's first and last goals of the tournament, against Quilmes Atlético Club and his "alma mater" Boca Juniors respectively; he also excelled at assisting his teammates, as in the fifth goal against Club de Gimnasia y Esgrima La Plata in a 7–0 win on 15 October derby (in which he also netted once).

Betis
Pavone signed for Real Betis in late June 2007. The player, who was on his honeymoon in the city of Seville, was purchased by for €6.8 million, becoming the first signing under compatriot Héctor Cúper's management.

Pavone's competitive debut came in La Liga on 26 August, as he played the full 90 minutes in a 1–1 draw at Recreativo de Huelva. In his first two seasons he failed to impress, but had a good run from November 2007–January 2008, when he netted six goals in five matches, including braces against Real Zaragoza (a 2–1 win, as a late substitute) and UD Almería (a 3–1 victory).

Pavone only scored twice in the 2008–09 season, and Betis returned to the second division after nine years. He was supposed to sign for Calcio Catania in Italy on 1 February 2010 but, due to Ewerthon's refusal to sign with the Andalusians in order to take his place, the deal was cancelled.

Return to Argentina
On 23 July 2010, Club Atlético River Plate and Betis arranged a one-year loan deal for Pavone, who returned to his country after three years. He scored five goals in the Apertura, helping the club climb out of the relegation zone.

River, however, would be scheduled to appear in the relegation playoffs against Club Atlético Belgrano. On 26 June 2011, after a 0–2 away loss, he scored in the first minutes of the game but also had a penalty saved by Juan Carlos Olave, in an eventual 1–3 aggregate defeat which sent the historical Buenos Aires team to the second level for the first time in its history.

On 5 August 2011, Pavone signed for Club Atlético Lanús on a free transfer. He made his debut on the 16th against Club Atlético Independiente, coming in at the 27th minute of the second half and scoring the game's only goal in injury time.

Pavone had a good run in the second semester, netting seven times in the 2012 Clausura and another four in the 2012 Copa Libertadores.

Cruz Azul
In June 2012, Pavone joined Cruz Azul in the Liga MX, helping to the conquest of two major titles in two years, including the 2013–14 edition of the CONCACAF Champions League where he scored his team's only goal in the finals and was awarded the Golden Ball.

Back to Argentina
On 13 January 2015, Club Atlético Vélez Sarsfield signed Pavone on loan. In June, after his contract expired, he rejected an offer from his first club Estudiantes and joined Racing Club de Avellaneda.

After five months at the Estadio Presidente Juan Domingo Perón, Pavone returned to Vélez for the 2016 season.

Later career
In July 2017, Pavone rejoined Estudiantes. He made his league debut in his second spell on 29 August, playing the entire 2–1 home victory over Arsenal de Sarandí.

On 22 May 2019, having contributed to a 5–1 defeat of Sarmiento de Resistencia in the round of 64 of the Copa Argentina, Pavone scored his 70th competitive goal for Los Pincharratas. On 25 June, the 37-year-old moved to Defensor Sporting of the Uruguayan Primera División after agreeing to a one-and-a-half-year contract.

International career
Pavone played one game for the Argentina national team, against Chile on 18 April 2007.

Personal life
Pavone's older brother, Gonzalo, was also a footballer and a striker. He played for nearly 15 clubs during his career, also competing in Spain (lower leagues exclusively).

Club statistics

Honours

Club
Estudiantes
Argentine Primera División: 2006 Apertura

Cruz Azul
Copa MX: 2013 Clausura
CONCACAF Champions League: 2013–14

Individual
Argentine Primera División Top Scorer: 2005 Clausura
Copa Libertadores Top Scorer: 2006 (joint)
CONCACAF Champions League Golden Ball: 2014

References

External links
Argentine League statistics at Fútbol XXI  

1982 births
Living people
Sportspeople from Buenos Aires Province
Argentine people of Italian descent
Argentine footballers
Association football forwards
Argentine Primera División players
Primera Nacional players
Estudiantes de La Plata footballers
Club Atlético River Plate footballers
Club Atlético Lanús footballers
Club Atlético Vélez Sarsfield footballers
Racing Club de Avellaneda footballers
Quilmes Atlético Club footballers
La Liga players
Segunda División players
Real Betis players
Liga MX players
Cruz Azul footballers
Uruguayan Primera División players
Defensor Sporting players
Argentina international footballers
Argentine expatriate footballers
Expatriate footballers in Spain
Expatriate footballers in Mexico
Expatriate footballers in Uruguay
Argentine expatriate sportspeople in Spain
Argentine expatriate sportspeople in Mexico
Argentine expatriate sportspeople in Uruguay
Boca Juniors footballers